James Cabell may refer to:

 James Branch Cabell (1879–1958), American author
 James Lawrence Cabell (1813–1889), American sanitarian and author